Grahamstown Dam is a major off-stream earthfill Embankment dam with a controlled labyrinth spillway and baffle chute that stores water from the Williams River. The dam is located north of Newcastle and within the Port Stephens Council local government area in the Lower Hunter Region of New South Wales, Australia. The dam's main purpose is water supply; it provides about 40 per cent of the potable water for the Hunter region; and is the Hunter's largest drinking water supply dam.

The impounded reservoir is called Grahamstown Lake or the Grahamstown Storage Reservoir.

Location and features

Commenced in 1955, completed in 1965, and commissioned in 1969, Grahamstown Dam is a major dam that receives its main inflow from the Williams River as well as its own catchment. Water flows into the Grahamstown Dam from the Williams River, upstream from the  Weir, which limits the inflow of tidal seawater; via Balickera Canal and pumping station, which are used to transfer water from the Williams River to Grahamstown Dam. The  Pumping Station; George Schroder Pumping Station and delivery mains are used to deliver water from the dam to the water treatment plant; and Grahamstown Water Treatment Plant.

The storage was formed by building an embankment across the outlet of a natural depression known as the Grahamstown Moors. Construction began in 1955, and although all the elements of the entire scheme were not completed until 1965, water was first supplied in 1960 during the severe drought from 1960 to 1963. The dam was built by the NSW Water Conservation and Irrigation Commission on behalf of the Hunter Water Corporation to supply water to the Hunter Region.

At 100% capacity the dam wall holds back  of water. The controlled labyrinth spillway is capable of discharging .

Upgrade of facilities
Since the dam was completed, major modifications include:
 1994: further work was undertaken to raise the level of the clay core to road level over the full length of the embankment and rock armouring of the main embankment was also undertaken; and

Criticism
At the time of the proposal for the construction of a dam at Tillegra, it was claimed that Hunter Water Corporation deliberately allowed the water storage levels in Grahamstown Dam run down in order to inflate the case for the 477 million Tillegra project.

See also

 Irrigation in Australia
 List of dams and reservoirs in New South Wales

References

External links
 
 
 
 

Dams in New South Wales
Dams completed in 1969
Port Stephens Council
Reservoirs in New South Wales